R v Patel is an important case in South African criminal law, heard on May 8, 1959. The appellant's attorneys were Levy, Rogaly & Cohen, Pretoria, and S. and v A Rosendorff, Bloemfontein. The Appellate Division ruled that "a person has the same right to use force in the defence of another from a threatened danger, as he would have to defend himself, if he were the person threatened."

Facts 
In an appeal from a conviction of culpable homicide, it appeared that the appellant's brother had been struck by the deceased on the back with a hammer, and—he was then in a crouching position—that the next hammer blow might have landed on his head. The appellant had in this critical situation used the only weapon to hand: his revolver. He had fired at the deceased and killed him.

Judgment 
The general principles mentioned by Watermeyer CJ, in R v Attwood, are that an accused is entitled to an acquittal on the ground that he was acting in self-defence if it appears as a reasonable possibility on the evidence

 "that he had been unlawfully attacked and had reasonable ground for thinking that he was in danger of death or serious injury. (Though there may be cases of lawful self-defence where the accused was originally the aggressor;"
 "that the means of self-defence which he used were not excessive in relation to the danger;" and
 "that the means he used were the only or least dangerous means whereby he could have avoided the danger."

The court in Patel appeared to approve this view, holding that a person has the same right to use force in the defence of another from a threatened danger as he would have to defend himself, if he were the person threatened. The Crown had failed to prove beyond reasonable doubt that the accused had exceeded the bounds of justifiable homicide.

See also 
 Crime
 Law of South Africa
 South African criminal law

References

Case law 
 R v Patel 1959 (3) SA 121 (A).

Notes 

Appellate Division (South Africa) cases
1959 in South African law
1959 in case law
South African criminal case law